Iturriaga is a Spanish surname. People with this name include:

 Eneritz Iturriaga, a Spanish former racing cyclist
 Enrique Iturriaga (1918-2019), Peruvian composer
 Felipe Iturriaga, a Chilean farmer and politician
 Javier Iturriaga, a Spanish footballer
 Juan Manuel López Iturriaga, a Spanish retired professional basketball player
 Manuel Carrillo Iturriaga, a philanthropist and Mexican politician
 Raúl Iturriaga, a Chilean Army general